The Society of Licensed Aircraft Engineers and Technologists (SLAET), which was founded as the Society of Licensed Aircraft Engineers (SLAE), was incorporated into the Royal Aeronautical Society in 1987.

Members are automatically eligible to transfer their membership to the RAeS.

Post-nominals
MSLAE - Member of the Society of Licensed Aircraft Engineers
MSLAET - Member of the Society of Licensed Aircraft Engineers and Technologists

References

Licensed Aircraft Engineers